Zabnik may refer to:

 Żabnik (disambiguation)
 Žabnik (disambiguation)